Jarle Pedersen (born 15 June 1955) is a retired Norwegian speed skater and the retired coach of the Norwegian speed skating team. He is from Kåfjord in Alta, Finnmark, but resides in Bjørnafjorden outside Bergen.

Pedersen competed in the 1980 Winter Olympics in Lake Placid and finished 6th on the 500 m. On 25 November 2009 he became the head coach of the Norwegian Speed skating team following Peter Mueller. Johann Olav Koss became his assistant. He has been a speed skating coach in the local team Fana IL. In Fana he was the coach for his son Sverre Lunde Pedersen. They are being reunited  on the national team since the son joined the team before the 2009/2010 winter season. Pedersen is educated as a Physical therapist and had that role in the Norwegian Olympic team under the 1998 Winter Olympics in Nagano.

References

1955 births
Living people
People from Alta, Norway
Norwegian male speed skaters
Olympic speed skaters of Norway
Speed skaters at the 1980 Winter Olympics
Norwegian speed skating coaches
Sportspeople from Troms og Finnmark